The Subaru Impreza WRC is a World Rally Car based on the Subaru Impreza road car. It was used by Subaru World Rally Team, Subaru's factory team, and replaced Subaru Legacy RS in 1993. The car was debuted at 1993 Rally Finland and won a total of six world rally titles, including three consecutive manufacturers' titles and three drivers' titles.

Evolution history

Group A Impreza GC, 1993–1996

For 1993, Prodrive recognized that a smaller, nimbler car would make a better platform for a rally car, and work on a Group A Impreza rally car began. It was 160 mm shorter in overall length with a 60 mm shorter wheelbase, as well as having a more neutral front/rear weight ratio. It also featured active differentials, a first for a rally car. At the 1000 Lakes Rally, Subaru debuted their new Prodrive developed Impreza derived Group A rally car, driven by Vatanen and Alén. Vatanen drove the car to second place on its debut.

In 1994, the Subaru team switched from Michelin to Pirelli tires.

For the 1995 season, the FIA mandated more restrictive air intakes in an effort to slow the cars down. Subaru countered this by introducing a new boxer engine with revised camshafts and a different compression ratio.

World Rally Car Impreza GC, 1997–2001

For 1997, the FIA replaced the Group A formula with a new formula called World Rally Car. This gave teams greater latitude in design and materials including vehicle width, suspension geometry, aerodynamics, intercooler capacity and engine modifications. This led to a totally redesigned car, the WRC97, featuring modified camshafts, cylinder ports and combustion chambers. The new body had two doors. The width of the car increased to 1,770 mm (69.9 in) with a revised suspension geometry. Power increased to  @ 5500 rpm, and torque was now .

The Impreza WRC98 was an evolution of the earlier WRC97, with computer controlled active differentials in the front, rear, and centre, and an electronic throttle. Mechanical failures were common and took the team out of contention for the title.

The WRC99, introduced at the first round of the championship, featured an electronically controlled, hydraulically actuated semi-automatic transmission with a drive-by-wire throttle, allowing the cars to be shifted with steering wheel mounted paddles, similar to F1 cars. This allowed the driver to shift gears faster, and reduced the chance of dog gear wear. Due to technical difficulties, the team struggled until the season's 7th round in Argentina. However, the car helped prove much of the technology seen on later cars. Subaru was the first rally team to implement this technology, which has been used on all WRC cars until it was forbidden by the 2011 championship rules.

Although the WRC2000 looked almost identical to the WRC99, underneath the sheet metal, its execution was radically different. Developed by Prodrive engineer Christian Loriaux, the team used the lessons learned from the WRC99 and applied them in the WRC2000's 10-month development, in which over 80% of the car's mechanical and electronic components were redesigned. The car debuted, and drove to victory, at the fourth event of the season, Rally Portugal.

World Rally Car Impreza GD, 2001–2008

The WRC2001 featured an entirely new look, based on the GD chassis Impreza WRX. The new body had four doors (instead of two), and featured revised aerodynamics, improved weight distribution, and a lower centre of gravity. However, all the mechanical development from the previous year, including the engine, suspension, and drivetrain remained, with subtle refinements.

The WRC2002 was introduced at Corsica, and looked largely the same as the previous year's car. However, development of the car continued throughout the season. Improvements were made to the driveshaft, transmission housing, and steering column, as well as to the turbo-charger and manifold, which was changed from a 4–2–1 configuration to a 4–1 configuration.

The WRC2003 was introduced at the 2003 Rallye Monte Carlo. It featured a revised look based on the updated Impreza production car introduced the previous year, with the "bugeye" headlamps replaced by the "blobeye" lamps. Technical improvements were made to the turbocharger and engine, aiming to increase torque at lower RPMs allowing greater driveability. The car's body shell was made both lighter and stiffer. Throughout the year modifications were made to the car's suspension.

The WRC2004 did not feature many cosmetic changes from the previous year's car, but did have refinements in the engine and body panels. It was introduced at Rally Mexico. A revised gearbox was introduced halfway through the season.

The WRC2005 was introduced following 12 months of joint development by Subaru and Prodrive, on 11 March 2005 at Rally Mexico. Its re-styled bodyshell was stiffer, and 30 mm wider to allow a wider track. The car featured more composite body panels, including front and rear wheel arches and bumpers in order to decrease weight. Engine enhancements included a lightened flywheel and revised IHI turbocharger. Revised water injection and fuel injection systems were also introduced.

The WRC2006 received the production car's second facelift with the "hawk eye" headlamps. It had several mechanical changes from the previous year's car due to rule changes which banned active differentials as well as water injection, as well as mandating that teams must re-use cars and engines on selected ‘pairs’ of events. Due to the rule changes, the car was introduced on the first round of the season.

The WRC2007, a revised version of the earlier year's car, was introduced at the fourth round of the championship, Rally Mexico. It featured new dampers, a different radiator and intercooler arrangement, as well as improved weight distribution, suspension geometry and differential set-ups. It was considered to be underachieving compared to the newly introduced 2007 Focus WRC and the all-new Citroen C4 WRC. The car suffered from extensive handling problems, resulting in Subaru withdrawing from Rally Finland on the second day of the rally.

Each transmission in the WRC2007 takes 85 hours to build, and costs over £75,000. The front and rear differentials are similar while the centre differential is unique. Each takes around 16 hours to build and costs about £20,000. The cases for the transmission and differentials are constructed from magnesium to reduce weight. Filled with oil, the transmission weighs 95 kg, and a differential weighs 25 kg. The car's engine, transmission and differential are individually oil sealed, so that they can be removed and replaced without fluid loss. This also helps the team replace the components in 10–12 minutes. The transmission's lubrication system has a 4.5 litre capacity and includes an oil pump to help control differential temperatures, which usually operate around 100C. The transmission retains the roadgoing Impreza's H pattern but utilizes a hydraulically actuated and electronically controlled semi-automatic gearshift.

World Rally Car Impreza GE, 2008
In December 2007, Subaru began testing the WRC2008, based on the all new GE chassis Impreza WRX. The 2008 car was expected to benefit from a decreased polar moment of inertia due to smaller overhangs, and also featured a double wishbone rear suspension. However, Prodrive found this setup inferior, and converted the rear suspension back to the original MacPherson design. An updated 2007 car was used for the first few rallies, while the 2008 version was readied for competition. Markko Märtin signed a deal to become the official test driver for the Subaru team in 2008, and completed the majority of the testing on the WRC2008.

During a 4-day test at Sardinia between 30 April and 3 May 2008, Petter Solberg and Chris Atkinson drove the WRC2008 for the first time.  A date for its debut was still not given.
On 20 May 2008, the Subaru World Rally Team confirmed the WRC2008 would make its WRC debut at the Acropolis Rally of Greece, beginning on 29 May. On the car's rally debut, the WRC2008 scored its first podium finish with Petter Solberg placing 2nd in the Acropolis Rally.

Chris Atkinson's third place two rallies later at Rally Finland was the final WRC podium finish for the car and the Subaru World Rally Team, which withdrew from the championship at the end of 2008 amidst the difficult economic conditions of the time.

References

External links

 
Feature story: P2000 Impreza wrc.com, 29 May 2019

All-wheel-drive vehicles
Group A cars
Impreza
World Rally Cars
World Rally championship-winning cars